Suzanne Cloutier (July 10, 1923 – December 2, 2003) was a Canadian film actress.

Biography
Daughter of Edmond Cloutier, the King's Printer in Ottawa, Suzanne Cloutier escaped an early unconsummated marriage to become an actress, first with Charles Laughton in New York and then the Comédie Française.  She appeared in films by Julien Duvivier and Marcel Carné, starred as Desdemona in Orson Welles' film of Othello (1951) and appeared in Doctor in the House (1954, the hit of the year in Britain).

She had acted earlier in London in a play by Peter Ustinov, and the two married in 1954. They had three children, Andrea, Igor and Pavla, and Cloutier appeared in the film of his stage hit Romanoff and Juliet.  The couple divorced in 1971, when Cloutier reconnected with Orson Welles, then at work on films never finished.  Cloutier later resettled in Los Angeles, and eventually in Montreal, Canada, in 1988.  The actress's age was often misreported, but she appears to have been born in Ottawa  July 10, 1923 and died in Montreal December 2, 2003.

Filmography

References

External links
 

1927 births
2003 deaths
20th-century Canadian actresses
Actresses from Ottawa
Canadian film actresses
Deaths from cancer in Quebec
Deaths from liver cancer
Ustinov family